Giaquinto is a surname. Notable people with the surname include:

Corrado Giaquinto (1703–1765), Italian painter
Nick Giaquinto (born 1955), American football player

See also
Giaquinta

Italian-language surnames